The following terms are used in American football, both conventional and indoor. Some of these terms are also in use in Canadian football; for a list of terms unique to that code, see Glossary of Canadian football.

0–9

A

B

C

D

E

F

G

H

I

J

K 

A punt, place kick, or drop kick

L

M

N

O

P

Q

R

S

T

U

V

W

X

Y

Z

See also 

 American football positions
 American football strategy
 Comparison of American and Canadian football
 Glossary of Canadian football
 List of NFL nicknames

References

Sources 
 Hickok, Ralph (1977). New Encyclopedia or Sports. New York: McGraw-Hill, Inc. 

 
American football
American football-related lists
Wikipedia glossaries using description lists